This is a list of the National Register of Historic Places listings in Lava Beds National Monument.

This is intended to be a complete list of the properties and districts on the National Register of Historic Places in Lava Beds National Monument, California, United States.  The locations of National Register properties and districts for which the latitude and longitude coordinates are included below, may be seen in a Google map.

There are ten properties and districts listed on the National Register in the park.

Current listings 

|--
|}

See also 
 National Register of Historic Places listings in Modoc County, California
 National Register of Historic Places listings in Siskiyou County, California
 National Register of Historic Places listings in California

References

External links

Lava Beds National Monument